Žepina ( or ) is a settlement in the City Municipality of Celje in eastern Slovenia. It lies on the eastern outskirts of Celje. The area is part of the traditional region of Styria. It is now included with the rest of the municipality in the Savinja Statistical Region.

References

External links
Žepina on Geopedia

Populated places in the City Municipality of Celje